George Maddox (born 1811 in Ireland), was an Australian cricket player, who played four games for Tasmania.

He has the distinction of having participated in the first ever first-class cricket match in Australia. Maddox's catch to dismiss the Victorian batsman W. Philpott for 17, off the bowling of Robert McDowell, was the first-ever catch in first-class cricket in Australia.

George Maddox died on 7 July 1867 in Melbourne, Victoria at the age of 56.

See also
 List of Tasmanian representative cricketers

External links
Cricinfo Profile

1811 births
1867 deaths
Australian cricketers
Tasmania cricketers
Irish emigrants to colonial Australia